The Portuguesa River (Spanish: Río Portuguesa, also Río la Portuguesa, Río de la Portuguesa) is a river of Venezuela. It is part of the Orinoco River basin, and is a tributary of the Apure River (which is, in turn, a tributary of the Orinoco).

Legend has it that the river's name originated from a woman from Portugal who drowned in its waters. In turn, the river's name is the origin of the name of the Venezuelan state of Portuguesa.

See also
List of rivers of Venezuela

References
Rand McNally, The New International Atlas, 1993.

Rivers of Venezuela